The 2005–06 Southern Professional Hockey League season was the second season of the Southern Professional Hockey League.  The regular season began October 21, 2005, and ended April 12, 2006, after a 56-game regular season and a six-team playoff.  The Knoxville Ice Bears won their first SPHL championship.

Preseason
The Asheville Aces, Macon Trax, and Winston-Salem Polar Twins all folded following the 2004–05 season.  Replacing them were the Florida Seals and Pee Dee Cyclones.

A new playoff structure was announced, with the top seed and sixth seed playing each other in a best-of-5-game series, with the winner advancing to the championship.  The second and fifth, and third and fourth seeds each play a best-of-3-game series, with the winners meeting in another 3-game series to determine the second finalist.

Regular season

Final standings

‡  William B. Coffey Trophy winners
 Advanced to playoffs

Attendance

President's Cup playoffs

(1) Knoxville Ice Bears vs. (6) Pee Dee Cyclones

The Knoxville Ice Bears and the Macon trax play at best of 5 round that will take the place of the first two playoff rounds.  The other four teams will play a best of 3 game Quarter Final and Simi Final round.

Quarterfinals
Note: game-winning goal scorer indicated in italics

(2) Columbus Cottonmouths vs. (5) Huntsville Havoc

(3) Florida Seals vs. (4) Fayetteville FireAntz

Semifinals
Note: game-winning goal scorer indicated in italics

(3) Florida Seals vs. (5) Huntsville Havoc

Finals

Awards
The All-SPHL teams were announced March 21, 2006, followed by the MVP on March 22, Defenseman of the Year on March 23, Coach of the Year on March 24, Rookie of the Year on March 27, and Goalie of the Year on Match 28.

All-Star selections

References

Southern Professional Hockey League seasons
South